Keith C. St. John (born August 5, 1957) is an American politician.  He is the first African American openly gay person elected to public office in the United States.

He started his legal career in Albany, New York in 1985.

On November 7, 1989, St. John won the election for Common Council Alderman in the 2nd Ward of Albany, New York. On November 2, 1993, he was reelected to another 4-year term.

References

1957 births
20th-century American lawyers
20th-century American politicians
21st-century American lawyers
African-American people in New York (state) politics
African-American lawyers
Cornell Law School alumni
Gay politicians
LGBT African Americans
LGBT lawyers
LGBT people from New York (state)
Living people
New York (state) Democrats
New York (state) lawyers
Politicians from Albany, New York
People from Westchester County, New York
Vassar College alumni
20th-century African-American politicians
21st-century African-American people